T. grandis may refer to:
 Tectona grandis, the teak, a tropical hardwood tree species native to south and southeast Asia, mainly India, Indonesia, Malaysia and Myanmar
 Tenedos grandis, a spider species in the genus Tenedos
 Terataspis grandis, a huge trilobite species from the Devonian that lived in a shallow sea in what is now New York State and Ontario
 Tillandsia grandis, a synonym of Pseudalcantarea grandis, a plant species native to Mexico and Central America
 Tmarus grandis, a spider species in the genus Tmarus found in Brazil
 Toromys grandis, the giant tree rat or white-faced tree rat, a spiny rat species found in Brazil
 Trachymene grandis, a plant species in the genus Trachymene

See also
 Grandis (disambiguation)